Antifrustrationism is an axiological position proposed by German philosopher Christoph Fehige, which states that "we don't do any good by creating satisfied extra preferences. What matters about preferences is not that they have a satisfied existence, but that they don't have a frustrated existence." According to Fehige, "maximizers of preference satisfaction should instead call themselves minimizers of preference frustration."

What makes the world better is "not its amount of preference satisfaction, but the avoided preference frustration." In the words of Fehige, "we have obligations to make preferrers satisfied, but no obligations to make satisfied preferrers." The position stands in contrast to classical utilitarianism, among other ethical theories, which holds that creating "satisfied preferrers" is, or can be, a good in itself. Antifrustrationism has similarities with, although it is different from, negative utilitarianism, the teachings of Buddha, Stoicism, philosophical pessimism, and Schopenhauer's philosophy. In particular, negative preference utilitarianism states that we should act in such a way that the number of frustrated preferences is minimized and is therefore directly based on antifrustrationism. The difference is that antifrustrationism is an axiology, whereas negative preference utilitarianism is an ethical theory.

The moral philosopher Peter Singer has in the past endorsed a position similar to antifrustrationism (negative preference utilitarianism), writing:

See also 

 Antinatalism
 The Asymmetry (population ethics)
 Buddhist ethics
 Deprivation
 Frustration
 Negative utilitarianism
 Painism
 Pessimism
 Stoicism
 Suffering-focused ethics

Citations

References

Axiology
Utilitarianism